B, ʙ (small capital B) is an extended Latin letter used as the lowercase B in a number of alphabets during romanization. It is also used in the International Phonetic Alphabet to denote a voiced bilabial trill. In the Uralic Phonetic Alphabet, it denotes a semi-voiced bilabial stop consonant.

It was also used in the writing of medieval Icelandic to denote geminated B.

Use 
To avoid the appearance of homoglyphs with a letter, during Soviet latinisation, the alphabets of the Sami, Abaza, Komi, Tsakhur, Azerbaijani, Kurdish and Bashkir languages, as well as the New Turkic alphabet, the Unified Northern Alphabet and the project of reform of the Udmurt script used ʙ as the lowercase form of the letter B. The letter also was used in the Adyghe and Hebrew-Tajik alphabets, although they were absent.

In the Middle Ages, the author of the First Icelandic Grammatical Treatise used 'ʙ' to transcribe geminate B.

In the International Phonetic Alphabet, / ʙ / represents a voiced bilabial trill. The symbol was adopted following the 1989 Kiel Convention.

In the Uralic Phonetic Alphabet, ‹ʙ› represents a semi-voiced bilabial stop consonant, denoted [b̥᪽] or [b̥] with the International Phonetic Alphabet, as opposed to ‹b› representing a voiced bilabial stop consonant.

Unicode 
The letter has been present since the very first version of the Unicode standard and is located in the IPA Extensions block as code point .

Computing codes

See also 

 B (the Latin letter)
 В (the Cyrillic letter)
 List of Latin letters
 Small capital letters

References 

Phonetic transcription symbols
Latin-script letters